Martin Kristoffer Andersson (born 6 September 1996) is an English cricketer. He made his first-class debut on 28 March 2017 for Leeds/Bradford MCCU against Kent as part of the Marylebone Cricket Club University fixtures. He made his Twenty20 debut for Middlesex in the 2018 t20 Blast on 17 August 2018. Before signing his first professional contract with Middlesex, he had played in the England Under 19 development squad in 2015, having hit an unbeaten 70 against Australia. Andersson began his cricket as a colt at Reading Cricket Club. He made his List A debut on 1 August 2021, for Middlesex in the 2021 Royal London One-Day Cup.

References

External links
 

1996 births
Living people
English cricketers
Middlesex cricketers
Leeds/Bradford MCCU cricketers
Derbyshire cricketers
Sportspeople from Reading, Berkshire
Berkshire cricketers